Pleasant Green, also known as the Andrews-Chesnutt House and Winston Walker House, is a historic home located near Pilot Grove, Cooper County, Missouri.  It was built about 1825, and is a two-story, five bay, Classic Revival style brick dwelling with a two-story wood-frame addition.  It features a front portico supported by six columns.  The house also has a -story brick section and one-story kitchen wing. Also on the property are the contributing smokehouse, a slave structure, and hexagonal wood-frame barn (c. 1900).  It was the home of journalist Stanley Andrews (1894-1994).

It was listed on the National Register of Historic Places in 1977.

References

Houses on the National Register of Historic Places in Missouri
Neoclassical architecture in Missouri
Houses completed in 1825
Houses in Cooper County, Missouri
National Register of Historic Places in Cooper County, Missouri
1825 establishments in Missouri